Bill Jennings (7 January 1920 – 1969) was a professional footballer.

During his career he played for Ipswich Town, Northampton Town and Rochdale.

References

1920 births
1969 deaths
English footballers
Ipswich Town F.C. players
Northampton Town F.C. players
Rochdale A.F.C. players
English Football League players
Footballers from Norwich
Association football forwards